Cuasso al Monte is a comune (municipality) in the Province of Varese in the Italian region Lombardy, located about  northwest of Milan and about  northeast of Varese. It takes the name from the Lombard term Chaos, (den). Whereas the term "al monte" refers to the fact that it is situated at the foot of Monte Piambello.

Cuasso al Monte borders the following municipalities: Arcisate, Besano, Bisuschio, Brusimpiano, Cugliate-Fabiasco, Marchirolo, Marzio, Porto Ceresio, Valganna. The Village makes part of the Cinque Vette Park and it lies at the foot of Monte Piambello.

Population history

References

External links
 www.comune.cuassoalmonte.va.it

Cities and towns in Lombardy